Hans Roland "Hasse" Backe (born 14 February 1952) is a Swedish football manager and former player who most recently led Finland's national team. Prior to this he managed the New York Red Bulls.

He has coached clubs in Sweden, Norway, Greece, England and the United States, and achieved his greatest successes in Denmark at FC Copenhagen and Aalborg BK.

Playing career
Backe's playing career lasted through the 1970s, mostly in the Swedish lower divisions, including one stint with Brommapojkarna in 1977–1978. He took up coaching while playing for Bro IK, and led them from the fifth to the third tier.

Managerial career

Early career in Scandinavia
Backe began his managerial career with Djurgårdens IF in his native Sweden from 1982–84, compiling a record of 38 wins, 20 draws and only 12 losses, which included a first-place finish in the 1982 Division 2 Norra. Following his early success with Djurgårdens IF he went on to manage Molde FK, Hammarby IF, Östers IF, AIK and numerous other top Scandinavian clubs. In 1989, he led Öster to a first-place finish in Division 1 Södra in which the club ended the season unbeaten in all 26 league matches and gained promotion to the Swedish Allsvenskan.

Denmark
He enjoyed his greatest success in Denmark, having won three Danish titles with FC Copenhagen and Aalborg BK. In his first season in Danish football Backe led Aalborg BK to the 1998–99 Danish Superliga title. He also helped guide the club to consecutive Danish Cup finals in his two years at the club. During the 2001 season Backe returned to Denmark to lead top side FC Copenhagen. During his time at the club the Danish side would enjoy one of the club's most successful spells. During this period Backe led Copenhagen to two Danish Superliga titles, one Danish Cup title, and two Danish Super Cup titles, which included a treble winning season during the 2003–04 season.

Panathinaikos
Backe was the manager of Panathinaikos in Athens until 14 September 2006, when he was fired after just three games due to the team's poor performance in this time. Although Panathinaikos won two of three league matches, a 2–0 home loss to Ionikos and a 1–1 draw at home in a UEFA Cup tie against Ukrainian side Metalurh Zaporizhzhia led to his dismissal.

Assistant to Sven-Göran Eriksson
In July 2007, he was appointed as assistant manager at Manchester City in the Premier League, working alongside fellow countryman Sven-Göran Eriksson. Prior to being appointed as Manchester City assistant manager, he worked as a senior advisor for Östers IF as well as a football analyst and commentator for Swedish TV4. Backe briefly resigned his position at Manchester City after a family crisis in Sweden forced him to take compassionate leave shortly into his time at the club, but after a month was able to return at his former post. Along with Eriksson, Backe and first-team coach Tord Grip parted company with Manchester City, joining Mexico with the two Swedes.

Notts County
On 27 October 2009, Backe was appointed as manager of Notts County; the Swedish coach signed a three-year contract with the club. He resigned just seven weeks later, on 15 December after a dispute about wages not being paid was announced. During his time with Notts County, Backe compiled 4 wins (including two FA Cup wins), 3 draws, and 2 losses.

New York Red Bulls
On 7 January 2010, Backe was named manager of New York Red Bulls. After a blistering start to the 2010 season, club fans began to create shirts and flags with his likeness, and these honors culminated in the birth of the Hans Backe Viking Army, an offshoot of the Empire Supporters Club and Garden State Supporters. In his first season with New York he coached the team to an Eastern Conference first-place finish. Then on 9 November 2012, it was announced that Backe would not extend his contract with the Red Bulls.

Finland
On 12 August 2015, Backe was named manager of Finland national football team, starting on 1 January 2016. His first official match with the team was held on 10 January 2016 and ended in a 0-3 defeat by Sweden. Backe was fired as head coach of Finland's national football team 12 December 2016. Finland did not win one single game during Backe's time as head coach; 11 matches resulted in 9 defeats and 2 draws.

Managerial statistics
Statistics accurate as of match played 11 June 2017.

Honours

Manager 
 Djurgården
 Division 2 Norra: 1982
 Öster
 Division 1 Södra: 1989
 Aalborg BK
 Danish Superliga: 1998–99
 F.C. Copenhagen
 Danish Superliga: 2002–03, 2003–04
 Danish Cup: 2004
 Danish Super Cup: 2001, 2004
 New York Red Bulls
 Eastern Conference Regular Season: 2010

References

1952 births
Living people
Place of birth missing (living people)
Swedish footballers
Association football defenders
Association football midfielders
AIK Fotboll players
Spånga IS players
IF Brommapojkarna players
Swedish football managers
Djurgårdens IF Fotboll managers
Molde FK managers
Hammarby Fotboll managers
Östers IF managers
AIK Fotboll managers
Stabæk Fotball managers
AaB Fodbold managers
FC Red Bull Salzburg managers
F.C. Copenhagen managers
Panathinaikos F.C. managers
Manchester City F.C. non-playing staff
Notts County F.C. managers
New York Red Bulls coaches
Finland national football team managers
Swedish expatriate football managers
Swedish expatriate sportspeople in Norway
Swedish expatriate sportspeople in Denmark
Swedish expatriate sportspeople in Austria
Swedish expatriate sportspeople in Greece
Swedish expatriate sportspeople in England
Swedish expatriate sportspeople in Mexico
Swedish expatriate sportspeople in the United States
Swedish expatriate sportspeople in Finland
Expatriate football managers in Norway
Expatriate football managers in Denmark
Expatriate football managers in Austria
Expatriate football managers in Greece
Expatriate football managers in England
Expatriate soccer managers in the United States
Expatriate football managers in Finland
Danish Superliga managers
Super League Greece managers
Major League Soccer coaches
People from Luleå
Sportspeople from Norrbotten County